The Gift of Time: The Case for Abolishing Nuclear Weapons Now is a 1998 book by Jonathan Schell.  The book is based on interviews with individuals who had responsibility for nuclear weapons policy in the United States, Russia and Europe, and who came to advocate the global elimination of nuclear weapons. Schell addresses the key issues of nuclear deterrence, disarmament, abolition, and breakout associated with nuclear weapons policy.

See also
List of books about nuclear issues
Nuclear disarmament
Anti-nuclear movement

References

1998 non-fiction books
American political books
Books about nuclear issues
Nuclear history of the United States
Nuclear weapons policy